NNR may refer to:

 National nature reserve, an area protected by a nation to preserve wildlife etc.
 Nishi-Nippon Railroad, a railway company in Japan 
 North Norfolk Railway, a heritage railway in England
 Naturally Nutrient Rich, a rating system for the nutritional content of food
 National Nuclear Regulator of South Africa 
 Connemara Airport, Ireland (IATA code: NNR)